Tokyo Industries Limited is a private company, based in the North of England,  with an estate of over 30 venues, including Nightclubs, Hotels, Bars and Restaurants.

History

Tokyo industries was founded in 1997 in Greater Manchester by Aaron Mellor, opening their first venue, Tokyo Project, in Oldham. A second venue opened shortly afterwards in Ashton-under-Lyne followed by a third, The Castle, in Oldham.

In 2013, the 150 year old premises The Castle was bought by Transport for Greater Manchester with plans to demolish the site due to the ongoing Manchester Metrolink construction. In October 2016, Tokyo Industries opened its venue Church Leeds with Leeds clubbing legend Dave Beer of Back To Basics.

Venues & Brands

The company operates numerous well known independent brands: Digital, Factory, Tup Tup Palace, Reds True Barbecue, Fibbers, Impossible, HANGAR 8289, Stein Bier Keller, BrewHaus, City Vaults, The Magnet, The Castle, Get Baked and Tokyo brands, in addition to a number of one off venues and events. The majority of their sites are owned freehold by the company, They are well known for using Funktion-One sound systems at almost all of their sites.

Night Clubs
 Factory 251 (Manchester UK) – The former headquarters of Factory Records, in Manchester, opened as a nightclub in 2010. The venue featured prominently in the 2002 film 24 Hour Party People. www.FactoryManchester.com
 Digital (Newcastle UK) – Digital opened in 2005 in the center of Newcastle upon Tyne. The award-winning venue was rated as the 11th best nightclub in the world by DJ Magazine.  www.YourFutureIsDIGITAL.com
 Tup Tup Palace (Newcastle UK) – A high end bottle service club in the center of Newcastle upon Tyne. www.TupTupPalace.com
 South (Manchester UK) – Originally opened in Manchester in 1995 and re-designed by Ben Kelly (designer), the award-winning designer of The Haçienda.
Church (Leeds UK)– A grade 2 listed church in Leeds, converted into a music venue for live bands and club nights. www.ChurchLeeds.com
 Impossible (Manchester UK) – A highly theatrical immersive clubbing experience with performers and actors located in Manchester, opened in 2017 and winning multiple design and innovation awards.  www.BE-IMPOSSIBLE.com
 Red's True Barbecue (Nottingham, Manchester, Leeds, Headingley, Newcastle, Liverpool UK) – An award-winning chain of authentic American BBQ restaurants and a supermarket retail range of specialist BBQ Sauces. www.TrueBarbecue.com
 Hangar 8289 (Ibiza Spain) – a creative arts and event space on the Spanish Balearic Island of Ibiza, 3 spaces focusing on MUSIC - ART - FASHION www.HANGAR-8289.com
 LOT613 (Los Angeles USA) – a creative arts and events space in the fashionable DTLA Arts District. www.LOT613.com
 Industrial Avenue (Dubai UAE) – an underground dance music club located in the Dubai Marina area of the United Arab Emirates www.IndustrialAvenue.com

Festivals
 Lost Village – Boutique summer festival in woodland outside Lincoln started in 2015 in collaboration with Moda Black owners, Jaymo and Andy George. www.LostVillageFestival.com
 Obonjan – Three month island festival held on a private island near the coast of Croatia  www.Obonjan-Island.com

Other Interests 
Desert Hills – a midcentury American hotel located in the fashionable desert city of Palm Springs well known for its historic architectural look and its Coachella Music Festival 2hrs drive from LA California  www.Desert-Hills.com
 Openlab – an FM radio station based in the Spanish Balearic islands of Ibiza & Formentera, broadcasting alternative electronic music on 106.4fm with an online creative art website  www.OPENLAB.fm
 HackRod – a spatial web based genetic design platform allowing users to design one of concept vehicles, outsourced as a digital twin and printed using industrial grade Industrial 3D Printers  www.HACKROD.com
 Off The Rails – a photographer and anti-art magazine in printed and social media formats & brand development partnerships www.OffTheRailsMag.com

References

External links

Hotel and leisure companies of the United Kingdom
Companies established in 1997
Nightclubs in the United Kingdom